Raimo is a masculine given name. 

People named Raimo include:

Raimo Aas (born 1953), Estonian humorist
Raimo Grönberg (born 1953), Finnish actor 
Raimo Hämäläinen (born 1948), Finnish professor of Applied Mathematics and Operations Research
Raimo Heino (1932–1995), Finnish designer of coins, relief figures and medallions
Raimo Heinonen (born 1935), Finnish gymnast 
Raimo Helminen (born 1964), Finnish ice hockey player
Raimo Hirvonen (born 1950), Finnish wrestler
Raimo Honkanen (born 1938), Finnish cyclist
Raimo Ilaskivi (born 1928), Finnish politician
Raimo Kangro (1949–2001), Estonian composer
Raimo Karlsson (1948–2007), Finnish wrestler 
Raimo Kilpiö (born 1936), Finnish ice hockey player
Raimo Lahti (born 1946), Finnish professor of Criminal Law
Raimo Mähönen (born 1938), Finnish politician
Raimo Manninen (alpine skier) (1940–2009), Finnish alpine skier 
Raimo Manninen (athlete) (born 1955), Finnish javelin thrower 
Raimo Pajusalu (born 1981), Estonian volleyball player
Raimo Pärssinen, born 1956, Swedish social democratic politician, member of the Riksdag since 1998
Raimo Sirkiä (born 1951), Finnish operatic tenor
Raimo Suikkanen (born 1942), Finnish cyclist
Raimo Summanen (born 1962), Finnish ice hockey player and coach
Raimo Epifanio Tesauro (1480–1511), Italian painter of the Renaissance period
Raimo Tuomainen (born 1957), Finnish health sociologist
Raimo Tuomela (born 1940), Finnish philosopher
Raimo Valle (born 1965), Norwegian civil servant and politician
Raimo Vistbacka (born 1945), Finnish politician and former member of the Finnish Parliament
Raimo de Vries (born 1969), Dutch footballer
Raimo Ylipulli (born 1970), Finnish ski jumper

See also
Raimon
Ramo

Estonian masculine given names
Finnish masculine given names